Tim McCray (born August 20, 1960 in Waycross, Georgia) was a Canadian Football League running back for the Ottawa Rough Riders from 1984 through 1985, and for the Saskatchewan Roughriders in 1986 through 1990. He was an All-Star in 1989, the same year the Roughriders won the 77th Grey Cup.

In 1989, Tim won his first Grey Cup and was selected to the All-West and All-CFL All-Star team for the first time.  He established career highs in all offensive categories as well as leading the CFL and breaking the Roughriders record for all-purpose yardage in the season with 2,684 yards.  Tim became the sixth Roughrider to break the 1,000-rushing-yard mark with 1,285 yards rushing.  Tim placed second in the club with 75 receptions for 749 yards.  Tim also led the Roughriders in kick-off returns with 650 yards on 29 returns for a 22.4 average.  Tim was the 1989 Saskatchewan Roughriders Molson Cup winner as selected by the fans as the most Popular Player.

References

1960 births
Living people
American players of Canadian football
Canadian football running backs
Ottawa Rough Riders players
People from Waycross, Georgia
Saskatchewan Roughriders players
Tulane Green Wave football players